Tom Eckersley (born 6 December 1991) is an English footballer who plays as a midfielder and defender for lower-league club Ramsbottom United.

Playing career

Bolton Wanderers
Eckersley joined Bolton Wanderers in 2000, progressing through the academy to sign his first professional contract in the summer of 2010.

Accrington Stanley
On 30 July 2012, he joined Football League Two side Accrington Stanley on a one-year deal following his release by Bolton Wanderers. His professional debut came on 11 August 2012, in a 1–0 defeat to Carlisle United in the Football League Cup, coming on as a second-half substitute for Aristote Nsiala.

Stockport County (loan)
On 5 October 2012, he joined Stockport County on a one-month loan deal. He made his debut for the club the following day as a second-half substitute.

Barrow (loan)
On 8 February 2013, he joined Conference Premier club Barrow on an initial one-month loan deal, Eckersley made one appearance with Barrow, before returning to Accrington Stanley.

Tamworth
On 21 June 2013, it was confirmed that Tom Eckersley had signed a one-year deal to play for Conference Premier side Tamworth. Eckersley made a quick impression for the Lambs, with 2 goals during the pre-season of 2013–14, in friendlies against Premier League sides Aston Villa and Stoke City.

Rushall Olympic (loan)
On 16 August 2013, Eckersley joined Rushall Olympic on loan.

Witton Albion
On 20 September 2014, Eckersley joined Witton Albion on a dual registration with AFC Fylde.

References

External links
 
 

1991 births
Living people
English footballers
Association football defenders
Association football midfielders
Bolton Wanderers F.C. players
Accrington Stanley F.C. players
Stockport County F.C. players
Tamworth F.C. players
Rushall Olympic F.C. players
AFC Fylde players
Witton Albion F.C. players
Curzon Ashton F.C. players
F.C. United of Manchester players
English Football League players
National League (English football) players